This article contains information about the literary events and publications of 1948.

Events
January 6 – The poet Pablo Neruda speaks out in the Senate of Chile against political repression and is forced into hiding.
January 28 – A debate between Bertrand Russell and Frederick Copleston on the existence of God is broadcast by the BBC.
February 5 – A private assembly of 50 major literary and artistic figures listens to a recording of Antonin Artaud's play Pour en Finir avec le Jugement de dieu (To Have Done With the Judgment of God), whose broadcast on French radio three days earlier has been prohibited.
February 17–November 24 – Venezuelan novelist Rómulo Gallegos serves as his country's first correctly elected President, until overthrown in a military coup.
March 21 – Halldor Laxness's The Atom Station (Atómstöðin) sells out all copies on its first day of publication.
May – Bertolt Brecht's The Caucasian Chalk Circle (1944) is first performed as a student production, in English, at Carleton College, Northfield, Minnesota. This year also sees the première of Brecht's adaptation of Antigone, at the Chur Stadttheater in Switzerland, with Helene Weigel in the title rôle.
May 4 – Sir Laurence Olivier's film of Shakespeare's Hamlet is shown. It will be the first British film to win the Academy Award for Best Picture.
c. June 1 – The first volume of Winston Churchill's The Second World War (1948–1953) is published.
September 8 – Terence Rattigan's one-act plays The Browning Version and Harlequinade are first performed at the Phoenix Theatre (London).
September 17 – The Irish poet W. B. Yeats, who died at Menton, France, in 1939, is reburied at Drumcliffe, County Sligo, "Under bare Ben Bulben's head", having been moved from the original burial place, Roquebrune-Cap-Martin, on the Irish Naval Service corvette LÉ Macha. His grave at Drumcliffe, with an epitaph from "Under Ben Bulben", one of his final poems ("Cast a cold Eye/On Life, on Death./Horseman, pass by"), becomes a place of literary pilgrimage.
November 13 – Alice's Adventures Under Ground, the original manuscript of Lewis Carroll's Alice's Adventures in Wonderland, bought by a group of American Anglophiles in 1946, is presented by Luther H. Evans (Librarian of Congress) to the British Museum Library.
unknown dates
The 20th and last edition of the Index Librorum Prohibitorum is published by the Holy See.
The London publisher Weidenfeld & Nicolson is founded by George Weidenfeld and Nigel Nicolson.
The Pulitzer Prize for the Novel is renamed the Pulitzer Prize for Fiction.
The Palatino serif typeface, designed by Hermann Zapf, is released by the Mergenthaler Linotype Company.

New books

Fiction
Ilse Aichinger – Die größere Hoffnung (The Greater Hope, translated as Herod's Children)
Martha Albrand – After Midnight
Jerzy Andrzejewski – Ashes and Diamonds
Isaac Asimov – "The Endochronic Properties of Resublimated Thiotimoline" (short story)
 Nigel Balchin – The Borgia Testament
René Barjavel – Le Diable l'emporte
Alexander Baron – From the City, From the Plough
Hervé Bazin – Viper in the Fist (Vipère au Poing)
Henry Bellamann – Parris Mitchell of King's Row
Elizabeth Bowen – The Heat of the Day
Christianna Brand – Death of Jezebel
Jocelyn Brooke
The Military Orchid
The Scapegoat
Pearl S. Buck – Peony
Taylor Caldwell – Melissa
Victor Canning – Panther's Moon
Truman Capote – Other Voices, Other Rooms
Al Capp – The Life and Times of the Shmoo
John Dickson Carr (as Carter Dickson) – The Skeleton in the Clock
 John Paddy Carstairs – Solid! Said the Earl
Adolfo Bioy Casares – The Celestial Plot (La trama celeste) (short stories)
Willa Cather (died 1947) – The Old Beauty and Others (short stories, including "The Best Years")
 Peter Cheyney – Dark Wanton
Agatha Christie
Taken at the Flood
The Rose and the Yew Tree (as by Mary Westmacott)
The Witness for the Prosecution and Other Stories
James Gould Cozzens – Guard of Honor
Edmund Crispin 
 Buried for Pleasure
  Love Lies Bleeding
A. J. Cronin – Shannon's Way
Osamu Dazai – No Longer Human
L. Sprague de Camp – Divide and Rule
L. Sprague de Camp and Fletcher Pratt – The Carnelian Cube
August Derleth – Not Long for this World
Lord Dunsany – The Fourth Book of Jorkens
Howard Fast – My Glorious Brothers
William Faulkner – Intruder in the Dust
Gaito Gazdanov – The Specter of Alexander Wolf (serialization completed)
Henry Green – Concluding
Graham Greene – The Heart of the Matter
Giovannino Guareschi – Mondo Piccolo: Don Camillo (The Little World of Don Camillo)
Hella Haasse (anonymously) – Oeroeg
L. P. Hartley – The Travelling Grave and Other Stories
Marguerite Henry – King of the Wind
Georgette Heyer – The Foundling
Zora Neale Hurston – Seraph on the Suwanee
Aldous Huxley – Ape and Essence
Hammond Innes – Maddon's Rock
Shirley Jackson
The Road Through the Wall
"The Lottery" (short story)
"Charles" (short story)
Anna Kavan – The House of Sleep
Patrick Kavanagh – Tarry Flynn
Yasunari Kawabata – Snow Country (雪国, Yukiguni, completed version)
 Arthur La Bern –  Paper Orchid
Halldór Laxness – The Atom Station
Alexander Lernet-Holenia – The Count of Saint Germain
Audrey Erskine Lindop – Soldiers' Daughters Never Cry
Ross Lockridge Jr. – Raintree County
E. C. R. Lorac 
 Death Before Dinner
 Part for a Poisoner
Norman Mailer – The Naked and the Dead
Thomas Mann – Joseph and His Brothers
Leopoldo Marechal – Adam Buenosayres
Ana María Matute – Los Abel
W. Somerset Maugham – Catalina
Gladys Mitchell – The Dancing Druids
C. L. Moore – The Mask of Circe
 Alan Moorehead – The Rage of the Vulture
Zoe B. Oldenbourg – The World Is Not Enough
Alan Paton – Cry, the Beloved Country
Ellery Queen – Ten Days' Wonder
Seabury Quinn – Roads
Anya Seton – The Hearth and the Eagle
Irwin Shaw – The Young Lions
Nevil Shute – No Highway
B. F. Skinner – Walden Two
Clark Ashton Smith – Genius Loci and Other Tales
Dodie Smith – I Capture the Castle
William Gardner Smith – Last of the Conquerors
Howard Spring – There Is No Armour
Robert Standish – Elephant Walk
Rex Stout – And Be a Villain
Cecil Street 
 The Paper Bag
 The Telephone Call
Ahmet Hamdi Tanpınar – A Mind at Peace (Huzur, serial publication)
Josephine Tey – The Franchise Affair
Gore Vidal – The City and the Pillar
Mika Waltari – The Adventurer (Mikael Karvajalka)
Donald Wandrei – The Web of Easter Island
Evelyn Waugh – The Loved One
Stanley G. Weinbaum – The Black Flame
Dorothy West – The Living is Easy
Thornton Wilder – The Ides of March
Brock Williams – Uncle Willie and the Bicycle Shop
Herman Wouk – City Boy: The Adventures of Herbie Bookbinder
Frank Yerby – The Golden Hawk

Children and young people
Bertil Almqvist – Barna Hedenhös: bilder från stenåldern (The Hedenhös Family: Pictures from the Stone Age)
Rev. W. Awdry – James the Red Engine (third in The Railway Series of 42 books by him and his son Christopher Awdry)
Hans Fischer – Pitschi. Das Kätzchen, das immer etwas anderes wollte. Eine traurige Geschichte, die aber gut aufhört
Antonia Forest – Autumn Term (first in the Marlow series of ten books)
Ruth Stiles Gannett – My Father's Dragon
Robert A. Heinlein - "Space Cadet"
Marguerite Henry – King of the Wind (Newbery Medal)
Lorna Hill – Marjorie and Co. (first in the Marjorie series of six books)
Tove Jansson – Trollkarlens hatt (The Magician's Hat, translated as Finn Family Moomintroll)
Astrid Lindgren – Pippi in the South Seas (Pippi Långstrump i Söderhavet)
Dr. Seuss – Thidwick the Big-Hearted Moose
Rosemary Tonks – On Wooden Wings: The Adventures of Webster
Geoffrey Trease – The Hills of Varna (also as Shadow of the Hawk)
Elfrida Vipont – The Lark in the Moon

Drama
Bertolt Brecht – Antigone, The Caucasian Chalk Circle and Mr Puntila and his Man Matti (Herr Puntila und sein Knecht Matti, first performed)
Robertson Davies – Overlaid
Witold Gombrowicz – The Marriage (first published, in Spanish translation)
Kenneth Horne – A Lady Mislaid
Margaret Kennedy – Happy with Either
Junji Kinoshita – Yūzuru (Twilight Crane)
Dudley Leslie and J. Lee Thompson – The Human Touch
Terence Rattigan – The Browning Version and Harlequinade
Jean-Paul Sartre – Dirty Hands (Les Mains sales)
Vernon Sylvaine - One Wild Oat
John Van Druten – Make Way for Lucia
 Arthur Watkyn – For Better, for Worse
Kerala women's Malayalam collective – Thozhil Kendrathilekku (To the Workplace!)

Poetry
Sukanta Bhattacharya (died 1947) – Chharpatra (ছাড়পত্র, "Certificate")
Olga Kirsch – Mure van die Hart
Derek Walcott – 25 Poems

Non-fiction
Winston Churchill – The Gathering Storm (The Second World War, vol. 1)
T. S. Eliot – Notes Towards the Definition of Culture
Robert Graves – The White Goddess
Frank Bunker Gilbreth Jr. and Ernestine Gilbreth Carey – Cheaper by the Dozen
Richard Hofstadter – The American Political Tradition
F. R. Leavis – The Great Tradition
Betty MacDonald – The Plague and I
Dumas Malone – Jefferson and His Time: Jefferson the Virginian
Thomas Merton – The Seven Storey Mountain
A. A. Milne – The Norman Church
Anthony Powell – John Aubrey and His Friends
Paul Samuelson – Economics
John Steinbeck (photographs by Robert Capa) – A Russian Journal

Births
January 1 – Lynn Abbey (Marilyn Lorraine Abbey), American writer
January 2 – Joyce Wadler, American writer and memoirist
January 20 – Nigel Williams, English author, playwright and screenwriter
February 3 – Henning Mankell, Swedish crime novelist, children's author and dramatist (died 2015)
February 5 – Christopher Guest, English-American writer, actor and director
February 15 – Art Spiegelman, American cartoonist
February 19 – Clive Sinclair, English short-story writer
February 28 – Mike Figgis, English writer, director and composer
February 29
Hermione Lee, English biographer
Patricia A. McKillip, American fantasy and science fiction novel author
March 4 – James Ellroy, American crime fiction author
March 17 – William Gibson, American-born speculative novelist
March 28 – Iman Budhi Santosa, Indonesian poet
April 4 – Patricia A. McKillip, American science fiction, horror and fantasy author
April 21 – Clare Boylan, Irish novelist (died 2006)
April 28 – Terry Pratchett, English comic fantasy author (died 2015)
May 31 – Svetlana Alexievich, Belarusian writer of literary reportage, Nobel Prize in Literature recipient
June 14 – Laurence Yep, American author
June 16 – F. van Dixhoorn, Dutch poet
June 21 – Andrzej Sapkowski, Polish fantasy author
July 22 – Susan Eloise Hinton, American young-adult author
August 2 – Snoo Wilson, English playwright and screenwriter (died 2013)
August 8 – Miranda Seymour, English novelist and biographer
August 28 – Vonda N. McIntyre, American science fiction writer (died 2019)
August 29 – Nick Darke, Cornish playwright (died 2005)
September 2 – Manfred Böckl, German novelist and writer of popular history
September 16 – Julia Donaldson, English author and children's writer
September 20 – George R. R. Martin (George Raymond Martin), American fantasy author
October 5 – Zoran Živković, Serbian author and academic
October 6 – Zakes Mda (Zanemvula Kizito Gatyeni Mda), South African novelist, poet and playwright
October 9 – Ciaran Carson, Northern Irish poet and novelist
October 17 – Robert Jordan (James Oliver Rigney, Jr), American fantasy author (died 2007)
October 18 – Ntozake Shange (Paulette L. Williams), African American playwright, poet and novelist (died 2018)
December 20 – Abdulrazak Gurnah, Zanzibar-born novelist, Nobel Prize in Literature recipient
unknown dates
Wolf Erlbruch, German children's book illustrator and writer
Ibrahim Kuni, Libyan novelist
Suzanne Robert, French Canadian novelist (died 2007)
Edward Rutherfurd (Francis Edward Wintle), English novelist

Deaths
January 2 – Vicente Huidobro, Chilean poet (b. 1893)
March 6 – Ross Lockridge Jr., American author (suicide, born 1914)
March 10 – Zelda Fitzgerald, American novelist (killed in fire, born 1900)
April 22 – Prosper Montagné, French chef and food author (born 1865)
May 5 – Sextil Pușcariu, Romanian linguist, philologist and journalist (heart failure, born 1877)
May 20 – Victor Ido, Dutch East Indian journalist, novelist and dramatist (born 1869)
May 22 – Claude McKay, Jamaican American writer (born 1889)
June 16 – Holbrook Jackson, English journalist, writer, publisher and bibliophile (born 1874)
June 21 – Alice Brown, American novelist, poet and dramatist (born 1857)
July 3 – Phelps Putnam, American poet (born 1894)
July 4 – Monteiro Lobato, Brazilian fiction writer, particularly for children (born 1882)
July 5 – Georges Bernanos, French novelist (born 1888)
July 21 – J.-H. Rosny jeune (Séraphin Justin François Boex), French science fiction writer (born 1859)
July 27 – Susan Glaspell, American dramatist and novelist (born 1876)
August 3 – Venetia Stanley, English correspondent (cancer, born 1887)
August 19 – Frederick Philip Grove, German-born Canadian novelist and essayist (born 1879)
September 8 – Thomas Mofolo, Sotho novelist (born 1876)
September 9 – Lajos Bíró, Hungarian novelist, dramatist and screenwriter (born 1880)
September 20 – Husain Salaahuddin, Maldivian writer (born 1881)
October 12 – Alfred Kerr, German theatre critic (suicide, born 1867)
December 13 – Michael Roberts, English poet and critic (born 1902)
unknown date – Eraclie Sterian, Romanian science writer and playwright (born 1872)

Awards
Carnegie Medal for children's literature: Richard Armstrong, Sea Change
James Tait Black Memorial Prize for fiction: Graham Greene, The Heart of the Matter
James Tait Black Memorial Prize for biography: Percy A. Scholes, The Great Dr Burney
Newbery Medal for children's literature: William Pene du Bois, The Twenty-One Balloons
Nobel Prize for literature: Thomas Stearns Eliot
Premio Nadal: Sebastián Juan Arbó, Sobre las piedras grises
Pulitzer Prize for Drama: Tennessee Williams, A Streetcar Named Desire
Pulitzer Prize for Fiction: James A. Michener – Tales of the South Pacific
Pulitzer Prize for Poetry: W. H. Auden: The Age of Anxiety

References

 
Years of the 20th century in literature